Quarrell is a surname. Notable people with the surname include:

Jami Reid-Quarrell (born 1978), Scottish actor
John Quarrell (1938–2000), Australian rules footballer
Lois Quarrell (1914–1991), Australian sports journalist